Evgenija Davydova (born 2 March 1984) is a Russian equestrian athlete. She competed at the 2018 FEI World Equestrian Games and at the European Dressage Championships in 2019 with her horse Awakening. She is based in Italy where she trains with Russian\Italian dressage rider Tatiana Miloserdova.

References

1984 births
Living people
Russian female equestrians
Russian dressage riders